Amarasilpi Jakkanna is a 1964 Telugu-language biographical film, produced and directed by B. S. Ranga under the Vikram Studios banner. The film stars Akkineni Nageswara Rao in the title role of Jakanachari, a legendary sculptor credited with building various temples of Kalyani Chalukyas and Hoysalas. Music was composed by S. Rajeswara Rao.

Amarasilpi Jakkanna is the first Eastmancolor production of Telugu cinema. It is a remake of director's own Kannada film Amarashilpi Jakkanachari (1964).

Plot
There existed a great sculptor named Mallanna (Nagayya) in the current day of the Karnataka region. His son Jakkanna (ANR) inherits these qualities from his father and becomes a great sculptor by the time he reaches young age. He spends most of the time in between stones and dreams of making them into great sculptures.

It is at this moment he falls in love with a dancer named Manjari (B. Saroja), a breathtakingly beautiful woman and a great dancer. They appreciate each other's art and get married. When things go on a relaxed pace, the king Gopadevudu (Udayakumar) lusts for Manjari. In dramatic circumstances, Manjari happens to dance in the court of Gopadevudu. Seeing that, Jakkanna is left heartbroken. He starts suspecting Manjari and establishes a huge temple compound. With severe sadness, Jakkanna leaves to an unknown location in grief. He tries to tell people not to love or fall for a woman and gets abused in return.

It is when Bhagawan Ramanujacharya (Dhulipalla) rescues Jakkanna and takes him in the direction of service to God. Jakkanna rightfully follows the path and dedicates himself to making beautiful temples. Meanwhile, Manjari who is already pregnant attempts suicide because her husband left him.  She is rescued by fishermen (Relangi, Girija) and delivers a baby boy. She names the son Dankana (Haranath). Dankana trains under his grandfather Mallanna and becomes a great sculptor.

Vishnuvardhana (Kannada Narasimha Raju), the Emperor of Hoyasala makes a huge temple in Belur on the advice of Ramanujacharya. Dramatically, Jakanna and Dankana meet there. However, they don't realize that they are father and son respectively.  Dankana points out a flaw in a brilliantly made sculpture by Jakkanna in public. Jakkanna takes the challenge and when Dankana hits the sculpture with a hammer, a frog comes out of it. Jakkanna immediately chops his arms off. Manjari reaches then and gets sad to see her husband and son. After the prayers in Belur temple in the presence of Ramanujacharya, Jakkanna gets back his hands. The family reunites. Jakkanna gets the title Amarasilpi, thereby making history.

Cast
Akkineni Nageswara Rao as Jakanachari
B. Saroja Devi as Manjari 
V. Nagayya as Mallanna 
Haranath as Dankanna 
Udaya Kumar as Gopadevudu
Dhulipala as Ramanuja Charya
Relangi as Sundaram
A. V. Subba Rao as Vishnu Vardhanudu
Suryakantham as Rajamma
Girija  as Gangu
Pushpavalli as Santhala
Jayalalitha as Dancer

Music 

Music was composed by S. Rajeswara Rao.

Awards
National Film Awards
National Film Award for Best Feature Film in Telugu - 1963

References 

1963 films
1960s Telugu-language films
Indian biographical films
Telugu remakes of Kannada films
Films scored by S. Rajeswara Rao
Films set in the Hoysala Empire
1960s biographical films